The 1911 Arfon by-election was a parliamentary by-election held on 11 February 1911 for the Arfon division in Caernarvonshire in North Wales, a constituency of the British House of Commons. It was the first by-election to be held after the December 1910 general election.

The by-election was held because the sitting Liberal Member of Parliament (MP) William Jones had been appointed as a Junior Lord of the Treasury in H. H. Asquith's Liberal government, and until the 1920s MPs appointed to positions in government had to seek re-election.

Jones died in 1915, triggering another by-election

References

Sources

1911 in Wales
1910s elections in Wales
1911 elections in the United Kingdom
Politics of Caernarfonshire
History of Caernarfonshire
Unopposed ministerial by-elections to the Parliament of the United Kingdom in Welsh constituencies
February 1911 events